Ičko's Peace is the name given to a peace treaty negotiated in between July and October 1806 by Petar Ičko, an Ottoman dragoman (translator-diplomat) and representative of the Serbian revolutionaries, during the First Serbian Uprising. Ičko had been sent to Constantinople twice in the latter half of 1806 to negotiate peace. The Ottoman Empire seemed ready to grant Revolutionary Serbia autonomy following rebel victories in 1805 and 1806, also pressured by the Russian Empire, which had taken Moldavia and Wallachia; they agreed to a sort of autonomy and clearer stipulation of taxes in January 1807, by which time the rebels had already taken Belgrade. The rebels rejected the treaty and sought Russian aid to their independence, while the Ottomans had declared war on Russia in December 1806. A Russo-Serbian alliance treaty was signed on 10 June 1807.

See also 
 Serbian Revolution
 Timeline of the Serbian Revolution

References

Further reading 
 
 

1806 treaties
Treaties of the Principality of Serbia
Bilateral treaties of the Ottoman Empire
1807 in Serbia
First Serbian Uprising
1806 conferences
Peace conferences
Ottoman Empire–Serbia relations